Maxine Evans is a Welsh actress who has worked extensively in television and theatre roles. She is best known for playing Rhian in the Sky1 TV comedy drama series Stella. and is also well known for appearing in one episode of the spin-off series of Doctor Who called Torchwood as her role of Helen Sherman in the episode "Countrycide" with actor Owen Teale. Maxine also played the character of Mrs Busby in the BBC drama Call The Midwife

Evans's career as a director started on stage at the Glasgow Tron Theatre in 1996. A play by Sharman Macdonald was underway, when the director was unable to continue Maxine was drafted from actor to actor/director to get the show to the opening night.  Two years later Maxine directed her first Short Film, in which she was nominated for Best Director at the Cork Film Festival. A year later she started directing for television on the drama Nuts and Bolts. She had started as script writer and head story-liner on the show the year before when it won a Royal Television Society Award. She continued to storyline, write and direct over the shows next three series.

During her last year on Nuts and Bolts, Evans was asked to take over as the series editor on Crossroads. Eight months later she moved into the story office of Coronation Street.

She has also directed a musical feature film Rain: An Original Musical. She worked on the YouTube comedy soap Storyline as director/producer. In theatre, her Olivier-nominated production of The Revlon Girl first enjoyed sell out runs at the Edinburgh Festival and London, winning Best New Play at the Off West End Awards before being nominated for Outstanding Achievement at the 2018 Olivier Awards.

Early life and training
Maxine Evans was born 9 November 1966 in Wales and grew up in the village of Seven Sisters . Maxine was a member of the West Glamorgan Youth Theatre and the National Youth Theatre of Wales. Where she acted alongside Ruth Jones. Maxine went on to study at the Guildhall School of Music and Drama where one of her classmates was a future 007 Daniel Craig
.

Career 
In 2006 Evans had a role in the Doctor Who spin-off Torchwood, appearing in the episode "Countrycide" as Helen Sherman, a cannibal who lived in the Brecon Beacons with her husband Evan Sherman, portrayed by Owen Teale, who worked alongside Evan and other villagers to get those passing by ready for harvest.

In the Sky1 TV Series Stella, she plays the part of Rhian, who pushes a dog around in a pram and hasn't had a shower for some time. She was at school with Stella and already has seven grandchildren, despite being only 42.

She also appeared as a semi regular character Mrs Busby in the BBC drama Call The Midwife.

She has also worked extensively behind the camera too. First writing, directing and as the head story-liner on the Royal Television Society Awards winning welsh drama Nuts and Bolts. She went on to be the series editor on Crossroads and story-liner on Coronation Street.

Evans's production of The Revlon Girl written by Neil Docking won Best New Play the Off West End Awards and was nominated for Outstanding Achievement at the Olivier Awards in 2018.

Personal life

Maxine met her husband Neil Docking while still at Youth Theatre in South Wales. She has no children of her own and talks about her struggles with infertility https://www.walesonline.co.uk/lifestyle/showbiz/stellas-maxine-evans-how-knew-9535020

She talks about how she is over the moon of the role she has in Stella, in which she plays a 42-year-old grandmother of seven: "I have two Staffordshire bull terriers that I love to pieces so I was overjoyed when I found out that the dog that I push around in a pram is a staff".

Film and television

References

External links
 

Living people
Welsh television actresses
1966 births